Wally Shoup (born 1944) is an American jazz alto saxophonist and painter. Based in Seattle, Washington since 1985, Shoup is a mainstay of that city's improvised music scene. Seattle Metropolitan named him one of the 50 most influential musicians in that city's history.

Born in North Carolina, and raised in Charlotte, Initially working as a schoolteacher, Shoup moved Atlanta, Georgia in the late 1960s, then to Colorado in 1970. There, he first lived in Manitou Springs and later in Colorado Springs.

By his own account, Shoup "grew up listening to black music in the South, the blues and jazz and R&B," was "introduced to free jazz in the late '60s… in Atlanta". Although his "voice is definitely influenced by African-American music" he "kind of felt like free jazz was the domain of black musicians." Hearing Britain's Music Improvisation Company, "he simultaneously discovered free improvisation and his calling as a musician." 
"It wasn't jazz-based," he would say in 2003." They were trying to find some new ways of improvising. I realized that was the kind of music I wanted to know about, and the only way I could know more about it was by playing it."

While in Colorado, Shoup had a three-hour weekly show on KRCC, the Colorado College radio station, where by Jason Heller's account (2003) he played jazz and experimental music from his own extensive collection, and "began using the studio itself as an instrument, manipulating multiple turntables and mixing in guest musicians who would improvise over the records…" Describing a band he organized during this period, the Creative Music Ensemble (active circa 1973–74), Shoup later said, "I was still developing some chops on the sax, so I wasn't a player yet; I was just the instigator. I had them play a number of gigs, and it just outraged and pissed people off. … People didn't know what to make of it. It was kind of like Mahavishnu meets Merzbow or something."

In 1975 he became an active organizer, deejay, and player of music merging free jazz, free improvisation and noise. After deciding he was ready to play the saxophone as a performer, he formed his first trio, in Colorado, with Ross Rabin and Keith Gardner, incorporating contact microphones on metal objects to create "noisescapes." He released his first album, Scree-Run Waltz in 1981.

In 1983 he moved to Birmingham, Alabama where he performed with Trans Duo (Davey Williams and LaDonna Smith), wrote for the Improvisor magazine and worked with dancer Mary Horn, with whom he toured European in 1985, after which he moved to Seattle.

Shortly after arriving in Seattle, Shoup became an early organizer of that city's Improvised Music Festival, which began that year, and which is now the United States' longest-running improvised music festival. Among the groups he performed with there were the New Art Orchestra and Catabatics. In 2010 he will participate in and help organize the 25th anniversary Seattle Improvised Music Festival.

In 1994 he and cellist Brent Arnold formed Project W, who would eventually open for Sonic Youth in Seattle in 1998. Writing in 1999, Andrew Bartlett described this as "Shoup's most vaunted ensemble… whose debut CD of the same name on the Apraxia label has become the stuff of legend." Bartlett singled out their emphasis on relatively short pieces as unusual for free improvisors.

Shoup has done two CDs with Thurston Moore of Sonic Youth Hurricane Floyd (Subliminal, 2000) and Live at Tonic (Leo Records, 2003) with Paul Flaherty and Chris Corsano. He has also made two recordings with Nels Cline of Wilco: Immolation/Immersion (CD, 2005) and Suite: Bittersweet (LP, 2007), both on Strange Attractors Audio House.

Shoup formed the Wally Shoup Trio in 2001 with bassist Reuben Radding and drummer Bob Rees. Speaking of his work in 2003, Shoup said, "I'm not quite as abstract as I used to be. On my new stuff, I'll play motifs and melodies and occasionally even a tune … I see noise as just another element to play with, just another texture or color or detail." More recent projects include Spider Trio (with Jeffery Taylor and Dave Abramson) and the Wally Shoup Quartet (with Gust Burns, Bob Rees and Paul Kikuchi).

Among the festivals where Shoup has performed are the Vancouver Jazz Festival (Vancouver, B.C.), Earshot Jazz Festival (Seattle), Le Weekend (Scotland), Birmingham Improvised Music Festival (Birmingham, Alabama), Seattle Improvised Music Festival and Open-Circuit Interact (Belgium). In 2007 he received a City of Seattle Arts grant in to work on improvised music, and in 2009 Seattle Metropolitan Magazine named him one of the 50 most influential musicians in that city's history.

Partial discography
 Subduction Zone (Nunatak, 2012) - trio with Dennis Rea and Tom Zgonc
 The Levitation Shuffle (Clean Feed Records, 2007) - quartet with Reuben Radding, Greg Campbell, and Gust Burns
 Bounced Check (Tyyfus Records, LP, 2007) - trio with Chris Corsano and Paul Flaherty
 Suite: Bittersweet (Strange Attractors Audio House, LP, 2007) - trio with Nels Cline and Greg Campbell
 Blue Purge (Leo Records, CD, 2004) - trio with Reuben Radding and Bob Rees
 Confluxus (Leo Records, CD, 2004) - trio with Toshi Makihara and Brent Arnold
 Live at Tonic (Leo Records, CD, 2003) - quartet with Thurston Moore, Paul Flaherty, and Chris Corsano
 Fusillades and Lamentations (Leo Records, CD, 2003) - trio with Reuben Radding and Bob Rees
 Stackpole (First World, CD, 2001) - quartet led and recorded by Dennis Rea
 Hurricane Floyd (Sublingual, CD, 2000) - live recording with Thurston Moore and Toshi Makihara
 Project W (Apraxia, CD, 1994) - trio with Brent Arnold and Ed Pias
 Scree-Run Waltz (Too Sound, LP, 1981) - duo with Ross Rabin

Publications
 Music As Adventure:  The Collected Writings of Wally Shoup (2011), Nine Muses Books,

Notes

External links

 
 Seattle Improvised Music
 the  Seattle Improvised Music Festival: A History, Seattle Improvised Music Festival, 2006.
 An hour-long set of free improvisation by Shoup,  recorded live on KEXP's Sonarchy Radio.

Free jazz saxophonists
American jazz saxophonists
American male saxophonists
Musicians from Seattle
1944 births
Living people
Musicians from Charlotte, North Carolina
Date of birth missing (living people)
People from Manitou Springs, Colorado
Musicians from Colorado Springs, Colorado
21st-century American saxophonists
Jazz musicians from North Carolina
Jazz musicians from Colorado
21st-century American male musicians
American male jazz musicians
Clean Feed Records artists